Viñas Cué is the site of a Paraguayan military prison a short distance from the capital, Asunción.

Its inmates have included Lino Oviedo.

Prisons in Paraguay